In municipal government, a Board of Control is an executive body that usually deals with financial and administrative matters. The idea is that a small body of four or five people is better able to make certain decisions than a large, unwieldy city council. Boards of Control were introduced in many North American municipalities in the early 20th century as a product of the municipal reform movement. They proved unpopular with many as they tended to centralize power in a small body while disempowering city councils.

Boards of Control typically consist of the mayor and several Controllers who are elected on a citywide basis as opposed to aldermen who were elected on a ward basis. The Boards were criticized as undemocratic. Boards of Control tended to be less representative of the diverse opinions and communities, with majority views among the population being overrepresented. As well, since they were elected by a larger electorate running for a seat on the Board of Control would be prohibitively expensive for many municipal politicians, resulting in wealthier politicians being more likely to run for the body. Lastly, Boards of Control tended to meet in camera rather than in open session in the manner of city councils, making them less accountable to the public.

Because of these problems, many municipalities abolished Boards of Control in the years following World War II. They were maintained in several municipalities in suburban Toronto, Ontario, Canada, into the late 1980s, including North York, Scarborough, York, and Etobicoke. The City of London, Ontario was one of the few remaining municipalities in North America to retain a Board of Control. It was abolished after the 2010 municipal elections.

See also
Toronto Board of Control
Ottawa Board of Control

Forms of local government
Local government in Canada
Local government in the United States